Pieter is a male given name, the Dutch form of Peter. The name has been one of the most common names in the Netherlands for centuries, but since the mid-twentieth century its popularity has dropped steadily, from almost 3000 per year in 1947 to about 100 a year in 2016. 

Some of the better known people with this name are below. See  for a longer list.

 Pieter de Coninck (?-1332), Flemish revolutionary
 Pieter van der Moere (c. 1480–1572), Flemish Franciscan missionary in Mexico known as "Pedro de Gante"
 Pieter Coecke van Aelst (1502–1550), Flemish artist, architect, and author
 Pieter Aertsen (1508–1575), Dutch Mannerist painter
 Pieter Pourbus (1523–1584), Netherlandish painter, sculptor, draftsman and cartographer
 Pieter Bruegel the Elder (c 1525-1569), Netherlandish painter
 Pieter Dirkszoon Keyser (1540–1596), Dutch navigator who mapped the southern sky
 Pieter Platevoet (1552–1622), Dutch-Flemish astronomer and cartographer better known as "Petrus Plancius"
 Pieter Pauw (1564–1617), Dutch botanist
 Pieter Brueghel the Younger (1564–1633), Netherlandish painter
 Pieter Both (1568–1615), first Governor-General of the Dutch East Indies
 Pieter Corneliszoon Hooft (1581–1647), Dutch historian, poet and playwright
 Pieter Lastman (1583–1633), Dutch painter of historical and biblical scenes
 Pieter de Carpentier (1586–1659), Dutch Governor-General of the Dutch East Indies 1623–27
 Pieter Nuyts (1598–1655), Dutch explorer, diplomat, and politician
 Pieter Claesz (1597–1660), Dutch still life painter
 Pieter Jansz Saenredam (1597–1665), Dutch painter of interiors
 Pieter van Laer (1599–1642), Dutch painter and printmaker
 Pieter de Grebber (c.1600–1653), Dutch Golden Age painter
 Pieter Post (1608–1669), Dutch architect
 Pieter Stuyvesant (later Peter) (c.1611–1672), Dutch Director-General of New Netherland 1647–64
 Pieter van der Faes (1618–1680), Dutch portrait painter in England known as "Peter Lely"
 Pieter Boel (1626–1674), Flemish still life and animal painter 
 Pieter de Hooch (1629–1684), Dutch genre painter
 Pieter Leermans (1635-1706), Dutch painter
 Pieter van der Aa (1659–1733), Dutch publisher of maps and atlases
 Pieter Burmann the Elder (1668–1741), Dutch classical scholar
 Pieter van Musschenbroek (1692–1761), Dutch scientist and inventor
 Pieter Teyler van der Hulst (1702–1778), Dutch merchant and banker (of Teyler's Museum)
 Pieter Burmann the Younger (1714–1778), Dutch philologist
 Pieter Hellendaal (1721–1799), Dutch composer, organist and violinist
 Pieter van Maldere (1729–1768), South-Netherlandish violinist and composer
 Pieter Boddaert (1730–1795), Dutch physician and naturalist
 Pieter Gerardus van Overstraten (1755–1801), Governor-general of the Dutch East Indies 1796–1801
 Pieter Maurits Retief (1780–1838), South African Voortrekker leader
 Pieter Harting (1812–1885), Dutch biologist and naturalist
 Pieter de Decker (1812–1891), Prime Minister of Belgium 1855–57
 Pieter Bleeker (1819–1878), Dutch medical doctor, ichthyologist, and herpetologist
 Pieter Oyens (1842–1894), Dutch painter 
 Pieter Cort van der Linden (1846–1935), Prime Minister of the Netherlands 1913–18
 Pieter Jelles Troelstra (1860–1930), Dutch socialist politician and republican
 Pieter Zeeman (1865–1943), Dutch physicist and Nobel laureate
 Pieter Cornelis Mondriaan (1872–1944), Dutch abstract painter
 Pieter Sjoerds Gerbrandy (1885–1961), Prime Minister of the Netherlands in exile, 1940–45
 Pieter Geyl (1887–1966), Dutch historian
 Pieter Willem Botha (1916–2006), President of South Africa 1978–89
 Pieter Kooijmans (1933–2013), Dutch Minister of Foreign Affairs (1973–77, 1993–94)
 Pieter van Vollenhoven (born 1939), the husband of princess Margriet of The Netherlands
 Pieter Aspe (1953–2021), Belgian crime fiction writer
 Pieter Hoekstra (born 1953), Dutch-American politician and diplomat
 Pieter De Crem (born 1962), Belgian Minister of Defence 2007–14
 Pieter Wispelwey (born 1962), Dutch cellist
 Pieter Smit (1963–2018), Dutch politician
 Pieter Huistra (born 1967), Dutch footballer and football coach
 Pieter van den Hoogenband (born 1978), Dutch freestyle swimmer
 Pieter Weening (born 1981), Dutch road bicycle racer
 Pieter Timmers (born 1988), Belgian freestyle swimmer

See also
 Sint Pieter, a village now incorporated in Maastricht
 Sint-Pieters, a suburb of Bruges
 Pieterburen, a village in the north of Groningen
Peeter

References 

Dutch masculine given names
Given names